Edward Joseph Hughes is an Australian politician representing the South Australian House of Assembly seat of Giles for the South Australian Branch of the Australian Labor Party since the 2014 state election. Hughes was previously a long-serving member of the Whyalla City Council. Hughes has expressed strong support for South Australia's development of its renewable energy potential as a Councillor and as a member of Parliament.

References

External links
Parliamentary Profile: SA Labor website

Members of the South Australian House of Assembly
Living people
Labor Left politicians
21st-century Australian politicians
Year of birth missing (living people)